Siteki is a town in eastern Eswatini, lying west of the Lebombo Mountains, with an estimated population of 6381 as of 2013.  It is named for a declaration of Mbandzeni permitting his troops to marry. The town name was listed as Stegi in the 1966 census, and the population then was 1,457.  The 1956 census counted 612 residents in Stegi.

Populated places in Eswatini

It is also a place very dense populated in areas well known like Mzilikazi, along the road to town  It has got two royal homes ....before Mzilikazi there is a Queen's home and then another one at Emoyen for the King 